The Grammy Award for Producer of the Year, Non-Classical is an honor presented to record producers for quality non-classical music at the Grammy Awards, a ceremony that was established in 1958 and originally called the Gramophone Awards. Honors in several categories are presented at the ceremony annually by the National Academy of Recording Arts and Sciences of the United States to "honor artistic achievement, technical proficiency and overall excellence in the recording industry, without regard to album sales or chart position".

The award was first presented at the Grammy Awards in 1975. According to the category description guide for the 52nd Grammy Awards, the award is presented to producers who "represent consistently outstanding creativity in the area of record production". The award was presented during the "Premiere Ceremony" and was acknowledged during the main ceremony.

Recipients

 Each year is linked to the article about the Grammy Awards held that year.an

Multiple wins and nominations
(Up to and including the 2023 Grammy Awards season)

Wins
4
BabyFace (3 solo, 1 with L.A. Reid)
3
David Foster
Quincy Jones (2 solo, 1 with Michael Jackson)
Pharrell Williams (2 solo, 1 as 1/2 of The Neptunes)
2
Greg Kurstin
Peter Asher
Arif Mardin
Rick Rubin
Jack Antonoff

Nominations
11
Jimmy Jam and Terry Lewis
7
David Foster
Quincy Jones
6
Babyface
5
Rob Cavallo
Nigel Godrich
Danger Mouse
Rick Rubin
4
Greg Kurstin
Walter Afanasieff
T-Bone Burnett
Dan Auerbach
Jack Antonoff
3
Dr. Dre
Arif Mardin
Brendan O'Brien
Hugh Padgham
L.A. Reid
Narada Michael Walden
Ricky Reed

See also
 Grammy Award for Producer of the Year, Classical
 List of Grammy Award categories

References

General
  (User must select the "Producer" category as the genre under the search feature.)

Specific

External links
Official site of the Grammy Awards

Awards established in 1980
Producer of the Year Non-Classical